Zimoveysky is a rural locality (a khutor) in Tryokhostrovskoye Rural Settlement, Ilovlinsky District, Volgograd Oblast, Russia. The population was 136 as of 2010. There are 5 streets.

Geography 
Zimoveysky is located in steppe, on the Don River, on south of the Volga Upland, 50 km south of Ilovlya (the district's administrative centre) by road. Tryokhostrovskaya is the nearest rural locality.

References 

Rural localities in Ilovlinsky District